Colony House may refer to:

Colony House (Simi, California), listed on the National Register of Historic Places in Ventura County, California
Colony House (Keene, New Hampshire), listed on the National Register of Historic Places in Cheshire County, New Hampshire
Old Colony House, Newport, Rhode Island, a National Historic Landmark and listed on the NRHP in Rhode Island
Colony houses, a type of house built in Edinburgh, Scotland in the 19th century
Colony House (band), an alternative rock quartet from Franklin, Tennessee